The Political and Constitutional Reform Select Committee was a select committee of the House of Commons in the Parliament of the United Kingdom from 2010 to 2015.

Remit 
The committee was created in response to changes to the machinery of government intended to give the Deputy Prime Minister, Nick Clegg, responsibility for political and constitutional reform. The functions given to the Deputy Prime Minister were as follows:
 Introducing fixed-term Parliaments
 Legislating to hold a referendum on the alternative vote system for the House of Commons and to create fewer and more equal sized constituencies, see Parliamentary Voting System and Constituencies Act 2011
 Supporting people with disabilities in becoming MPs
 Introducing a power for people to recall their MPs
 Developing proposals for a wholly or mainly elected second chamber
 Speeding up implementation of individual voter registration
 Considering the "West Lothian question"
 Introducing a statutory register of lobbyists
 Reforming party funding
 Supporting all postal primaries

In addition, the Deputy Prime Minister had ministerial responsibility for the Boundary Commissions, the Electoral Commission, and the Independent Parliamentary Standards Authority. All these matters were within the remit of the committee.

Membership 
As of 30 March 2015, the membership of the committee was as follows:

Source: Political and Constitutional Reform Committee

Changes 
Occasionally, the House of Commons orders changes to be made in terms of membership of select committees, as proposed by the Committee of Selection. Such changes are shown below.

See also 
 Parliamentary Committees of the United Kingdom

References

External links 
 Political and Constitutional Reform Committee
 Records for this Committee are held at the Parliamentary Archives

Defunct Select Committees of the British House of Commons
2010 establishments in the United Kingdom
Reform in the United Kingdom
Politics of the United Kingdom
Constitution of the United Kingdom
2015 disestablishments in the United Kingdom